Osip Afanasievich Petrov was a Russian operatic bass-baritone of great range and renown, whose career centred on St Petersburg.

Biography

Osip Petrov was born in Yelisavetgrad (now Kropyvnytskyi) in Ukraine, then part of Russia.  He started his career by singing in a church chorus. Petrov then worked in Russian provincial theaters (including Poltava, where he worked together with Mikhail Shchepkin).

From 1830 until his death in 1878 he worked for the Mariinsky Theatre, St Petersburg.  His career was one triumph after another, and he created a number of important roles in Russian operas, by composers such as Dargomyzhsky, Glinka, Mussorgsky, Rimsky-Korsakov, Anton Rubinstein, Tchaikovsky and others.

His 50th anniversary as a singer was the cause for national celebration.  On 21 April 1876, on the stage of the Maryinsky Theatre, he was presented with a gold medal, the personal gift of Tsar Alexander II.  The President of the Russian Musical Society, the Tsar's uncle, Grand Duke Konstantin, presented an address in his honour.  Messages from all over Russia were read out.  Then he was presented with a wreath made of 100 gold leaves studded with diamonds, one leaf for each of the 100 operas in which he had sung. Tchaikovsky wrote a Cantata (Hymn) on the Occasion of the Celebration of the 50th Jubilee of the Singer Osip Afanasievich Petrov, for tenor, chorus and orchestra, with words by Nikolay Nekrasov.  This was performed at the St Petersburg Conservatory on 6 May 1876, under the conductor Karl Davydov.

Petrov's 52-year career continued until the night before he died.

His wife was a Russian operatic contralto, Anna Vorobyova.

Performance repertoire
He created the following roles:
 Susanin in  Catterino Cavos's Ivan Susanin
 Leporello in Dargomyzhsky's The Stone Guest
 Susanin in  Glinka's A Life for the Tsar
 Ruslan in Glinka's Ruslan and Lyudmila
 Varlaam in Mussorgsky's Boris Godunov
 Ivan the Terrible in Rimsky-Korsakov's The Maid of Pskov
 Prince Gudal in Anton Rubinstein's The Demon
 Oziya in Serov's Judith
 Prince Vladimir in Serov's Rogneda
 Kochubey in Tchaikovsky's Mazeppa
 Neizvestnyi (The Unknown Man) in Verstovsky's Askold's Grave.

References

External links

Biography 

1806 births
1878 deaths
Musicians from Kropyvnytskyi
19th-century male opera singers from the Russian Empire
Operatic bass-baritones
Burials at Tikhvin Cemetery